"One Tin Soldier" is a 1960s counterculture era anti-war song written by Dennis Lambert and Brian Potter.  Canadian pop group The Original Caste (consisting of Dixie Lee Innes, Bruce Innes, Graham Bruce, Joseph Cavender and Bliss Mackie) first recorded it in 1969 for both the TA label and its parent Bell label.

The song, recorded by various artists, charted each year from 1969 to 1974 on various charts in the United States and Canada.  However, it did not chart outside North America.

"One Tin Soldier" went to number 6 on the RPM Magazine charts, hit the number 1 position on CHUM AM in Toronto on 27 December 1969, and reached number 34 on the Billboard Hot 100 Chart in early 1970.  It was a bigger hit on the Billboard Easy Listening Chart (Adult Contemporary), reaching number 25 and number 5 on the Canada Adult Contemporary Chart.

A 1971 cover was a hit in the U.S. for Jinx Dawson, lead vocalist of Coven, whose recording was featured in the film Billy Jack.  The single went to number 26 on the Billboard pop chart before it was pulled from radio by the film's producer.  On November 20, 1971, Coven performed "One Tin Soldier" on the Dick Clark ABC-TV Saturday-afternoon program American Bandstand.  A re-recorded version by Coven made the Billboard chart in 1973, peaking at number 79.

In 1972, Skeeter Davis had moderate success on the American country charts with her rendering, but did very well in Canada, peaking at number 4 on the country chart and number 2 on the Adult Contemporary chart.  Davis received a Grammy nomination for Best Female Country Vocal.

Harmony
"One Tin Soldier" has been said to have the same harmonic base as Pachelbel's Canon. The intro is pulled directly from "Canon in D" with the first 7 chords of "One Tin Soldier" matching those of "Canon in D". However, the two pieces diverge at the 8th chord and 8th note of each part respectively. The remainder of "One Tin Soldier" merely has some aural similarities in the verses and has several significantly different chords.

Lyrics synopsis
"One Tin Soldier" describes the story of a fictional Kingdom located on a mountain, who possess a great treasure. The neighboring faction from the mountain's valley becomes envious of this treasure, and intend to claim it for themselves, suspecting it may be gold. The Kingdom refuses their request, instead offering to share it rather than surrender it outright. The people of the valley proceed to invade the Kingdom and kill everyone in order to seize the treasure. Once the treasure is located, it is revealed that it is actually a boulder inscribed with "peace on earth" on the bottom, implying the invasion was pointless.

Coven version

Singer Jinx Dawson of the band Coven performed the song at a 1971 session with the film's orchestra as part of the soundtrack for the Warner Bros. film Billy Jack. Dawson asked that her band, Coven, be listed on the recording and film, not her name as a solo artist. This Warner release, titled as "One Tin Soldier (The Legend of Billy Jack)", reached number 26 on the Billboard Hot 100 in the fall of 1971.

The full Coven band then re-recorded the song for their self-titled MGM album, which displayed the band members' whited-out faces on the cover, contrived by the film's producer Tom Laughlin. Coven hit the charts again with the song in 1973, in both the new MGM recording and a reissue of their Warner original.  The Coven recording was named Number One All Time Requested Song in 1971 and 1973 by the American Radio Broadcasters Association.

Chart history
 The Original Caste 

 Coven cover

 Skeeter Davis cover

 Coven (2nd charting)

 Coven (3rd charting)

Other recordings
A version recorded by Guy Chandler (titled "One Tin Soldier [The Legend of Billy Jack]") was released in the summer of 1973.

A version sung by Coven, with a video created by animator John David Wilson was produced for The Sonny & Cher Comedy Hour.

Roseanne Barr parodied the song on her 1990 album I Enjoy Being a Girl.

Delores Laughlin, sung an abbreviated version of the song during the end credits of the film sequel "Billy Jack Goes to Washington"(1977).

The song has been covered by other artists, including Billy Strings, Mad Parade, Gimp, Me First and the Gimme Gimmes,  Bushman, and Killdozer. Actress Brittany Murphy, in character as Luanne Platter, sang the song on the King of the Hill soundtrack. This song was also covered by Voices for Peace, a band consisting of a group of voice actors including Greg Ayres and Tiffany Grant. Abigail and Milly Shapiro covered the song for their live album Live Out Loud.

Toronto hardcore punk band, Direct Action, included a cover of the song on their "Trapped in a World" LP (1985).

The progressive bluegrass band The Bluegrass Alliance covered the song at bluegrass festivals in the early 1970s.

See also
 List of anti-war songs

References

1960s ballads
1969 songs
1969 singles
1971 singles
Anti-war songs
Bell Records singles
Folk ballads
Folk rock songs
Rock ballads
Skeeter Davis songs
Songs against racism and xenophobia
Songs based on fairy tales
Songs written by Brian Potter (musician)
Songs written by Dennis Lambert
Warner Records singles